Tremors 2: Aftershocks is a 1996 direct-to-video  sequel to Tremors, in which the character of Earl Bassett, returning from the first film, is hired to deal with a subterranean "graboid" infestation at a Mexican oilfield. It was directed by S. S. Wilson, and stars Fred Ward, Christopher Gartin, Michael Gross, and Helen Shaver.

After spending all the reward money from his first encounter with Graboids, Earl Bassett agrees to hunt more of the deadly creatures at a Mexican oil refinery for $50,000 each. Knowing that he cannot face the monsters alone, Earl recruits Burt Gummer, another veteran of the incident in Nevada, to supply the firepower. There is only one problem: the Graboids have now evolved into creatures able to attack above ground.

Reviews for the film were mostly positive, with some critics labeling it one of the best direct-to-video sequels ever made.

The film is the second in the Tremors franchise. It was followed by a 2001 sequel, Tremors 3: Back to Perfection.

Plot
Years after the events of the first film, Val McKee has moved away and married Rhonda LeBeck, while Earl Basset has squandered his fortune on a failing ostrich ranch. He is approached by Carlos Ortega, who informs him that Graboids are killing his workers at his oil field in Chiapas, Mexico, and hires him to hunt them down. Earl initially declines, but Ortega's taxi driver, Grady Hoover, convinces Earl to change his mind after mentioning that Ortega will pay $50,000 for each Graboid killed; both join the hunt. Upon arrival, Earl learns that the company would pay him double if he caught one of the creatures alive. He also meets geologist Kate Reilly, her assistant Julio, and a mechanic named Pedro, all of whom are scientifically investigating the Graboids.

Earl and Grady begin systematically killing the Graboids by using remote-controlled cars rigged with explosives. Though their strategy seems to work, the vast number of Graboids overwhelms them and Earl enlists the help of Burt Gummer, who arrives with a "deuce-and-a-half" truck loaded with firearms and explosives. The next day, Earl and Grady are surprised by one of the Graboids, causing them to drive backwards in a panic and crash the truck into an inclined ditch. Returning to where they saw the Graboid, Earl and Grady find that the creature looks sick and non-aggressive with all of its tentacles mysteriously dead. Realizing they have one of the creatures alive (which Ortega offered $100,000 if accomplished), they call Pedro to come and pick them up along with the Graboid. However, the Graboid later begins making horrific and painful sounds and is soon found dead with a huge hole torn open into its body. They see Pedro's truck approach from the distance but it suddenly stops, prompting Grady and Earl to investigate and discover the truck’s destroyed engine as well as Pedro’s remains. They make their way to a nearby radio broadcasting building which has similarly been destroyed, only to be met by strange bipedal graboid-like creatures. Earl successfully kills one as it charges him, but the two flee in a car they had found as more of the creatures arrive. Meanwhile, Burt's truck is ambushed by a pack of these new creatures while returning to base.

The following morning, the creatures have made their way to the oil refinery, where Julio is violently killed by one. Grady and Earl arrive before it can attack Kate, with Burt shortly arriving thereafter following a near-fatal firefight that has left him drained of ammunition. Through experimentation, the group discovers that these creatures (now dubbed 'Shriekers') are hermaphrodites that can replicate at an incredible rate after eating enough food. They also learn that the creatures cannot hear unlike their predecessors, but rather see heat through special infrared receptors on their heads. However, they are attacked by the Shriekers, who have discovered Burt's MRE food supply and have rapidly doubled their numbers in a matter of minutes. They run for Julio's car, but Burt accidentally disables it while killing a Shrieker.

Hiding from the Shriekers, Burt is trapped in a bulldozer bucket while Grady, Kate, and Earl are on top of an oil tower. The Shriekers work together in an attempt to climb the tower before Burt traps them in the storage shed with the truck. However, they discover rice flour is stored inside as well, enabling the Shriekers to continue eating and multiplying inside. Earl douses himself in CO2 from a fire extinguisher to hide his body heat, and tries to find Burt's explosives amongst the Shriekers, who have multiplied into dozens of creatures. While the plan initially works, the  quickly wears off and the Shriekers detect his body heat, forcing Earl to throw the detonator among Burt's supplies before escaping. The group manages to escape before a massive explosion devastates the entire facility, destroying all of the Shriekers with it. In the aftermath, Earl and Kate decide to pursue each other romantically, while Grady suggests opening a monster-themed theme park due to the money Ortega now owes them.

Cast
 Fred Ward as Earl Bassett 
 Christopher Gartin as Grady Hoover
 Helen Shaver as Dr. Kate Reilly. Credited as Kate White.
 Michael Gross as Burt Gummer
 Marcelo Tubert as Sr. Carlos Ortega
 Marco Hernandez as Julio
 José Rosario as Pedro
 Thomas Rosales Jr. as Oil Worker

Production

Development
Tremors 2: Aftershocks began production in 1993 when MCA Universal (feature films division) liked the script. The film was originally planned to be filmed in Australia on a 17 million-dollar budget with the proposal that Kevin Bacon and Reba McEntire would both be returning. Unfortunately, McEntire declined due to a major tour she had currently been on, and Bacon, while intrigued, ultimately turned it down to do Apollo 13. Due to the lack of star power and the mediocre box-office performance of the first film, the distributional and promotional cost for a theater release was considered to be too high and the feature film division lost interest. The film was on the verge of being canceled entirely due to high costs when several actors and effects artists offered to lower their rates or do the jobs for free just to help the film get produced; this included S.S. Wilson, who offered to direct the film for free to save money on hiring another director.

Although the first film was only a minor theatrical hit, it would go on to be far more successful on the home-video rental market. This caused Tremors 2 to be moved to the MCA/Universal home video division on a budget of $4 million. Despite the budget being severely slashed, the same script was ultimately used but with several special effects sequences scrapped, including a scene where Burt Gummer commandeers a tank and a scene where characters fight the monsters using American Civil War muskets. To assist with costs, the location was changed from Australia to southern Mexico. Filming took place near Valencia, California in a total of 27 days in early 1994. The film was also released straight-to-video with only a limited theater release.

Props
In Tremors 2: Aftershocks, the creature design team, Amalgamated Dynamics, was faced with a challenge different from the first film. In Tremors, the graboids spend most of their time underground, and thus a prop was not needed for these scenes. However, in this film the shriekers spend all their time above ground and there are always more shriekers than graboids, thus the need for more props. The shrieker props used in the film include two fully articulated, full-scale puppet shrieker, three hand-puppet versions of the shriekers, and three un-jointed non-articulated rubber shrieker dummies. The fully articulated, full-scale puppet shrieker required 16 puppeteers to operate, while the rubber shrieker dummies, not requiring puppeteers, were used in scenes when a shrieker needed to be dropped, shot, or exploded.

One of the full scale graboids used in the film was a refurbished model that was used in the first film.

Effects
To achieve the infrared view of the shriekers as seen in several scenes, the actors wore red suits and yellow stockings, then were shot in Hi-8 video tape and blown up to 35mm film to add an additional grainy effect. The post-production video engineers then rendered the faces and bodies in different colors.

The scene where a baby shrieker is seen was created using a full size shrieker in a large cage, making the shrieker look small. As a consequence, no actors could be shown at the same time as the cage and shrieker.

In addition to the shriekers designed by Amalgamated Dynamics, some scenes in the film utilized shriekers that were computer generated imagery (CGI) designed by Tippett Studio. These animated shriekers were used when ever the film depicts them as walking, running, or climbing, as these movements were beyond the capabilities of the fully articulated puppet shriekers.

Release and Reception

After the film had been finished, its release date was delayed numerous times when test screenings were met with glowing reviews, which lead to its creators and the studio to consider theatrical distribution. A release date was finally set for April 9, 1996, over two years after the film had been finished. Although a theatrical release was deemed too expensive, the film did receive a very small limited screening in international theaters with an exclusive premiere screening that took place on April 9, 1996 at 8 PM in the Alfred Hitchcock Theater in Hollywood, California. The film was released on Videocassette on April 9, 1996 and on laserdisc on April 16, 1996.

As of March 2021, Tremors 2: Aftershocks holds a 50% rating on Rotten Tomatoes based on reviews from 8 critics.
TV Guide gave the film a positive review, saying "this movie is a rarity among direct-to-video sequels, one that's not only worthy of its theatrical predecessor but suggests that it too, belongs on the big screen...despite the significantly lower budget, the monsters remain entirely convincing." Ty Burr of Entertainment Weekly gave the film a mixed C+, calling it "definitely not as bad as a lot of straight-to-tape sequels" and further praised the acting, cinematography, and effects, but gave negative criticisms to the film's second half, saying "the movie becomes a bald-faced imitation of Jurassic Park." In an essay on direct-to-video horror sequels, Gavin Al-Asif for the Houston Chronicle gave the film a glowing review, saying "Tremors 2 is probably the best direct-to-video sequel ever made...it's leaps and bounds ahead of any of its competitors, including some theatrical sequels."

References

External links

 Official Site
 
 

1996 films
1996 action comedy films
1996 horror films
1990s comedy horror films
American comedy horror films
Films set in Mexico
Tremors (franchise)
Direct-to-video sequel films
1990s monster movies
Direct-to-video horror films
Universal Pictures direct-to-video films
1990s English-language films
1990s American films